Sarah P. Gibbs  (May 25, 1930 – September 25, 2014) was Emeritus Professor of Biology at McGill University in Canada, where she was initially appointed as an assistant professor on tenure track in September 1966. She was a Fellow of the Royal Society of Canada, and a Fellow of the American Association for the Advancement of Science, and she received the 2003 Gilbert Morgan Smith medal for research on algae.

Gibbs was born on May 25, 1930 in Boston, and  received a bachelor's degree  in zoology in 1952 at  Cornell University in Ithaca, New York. She  continued at Cornell completing  a Master's program  in zoology with a minor in education. Her first scientific position, post-Master's degree, was working as a technician for zoology professor Marcus Singer.
She moved with her then-husband, Bob Gibbs, to Woods Hole, Massachusetts,  and  obtained a part-time laboratory technician position with Ralph Lewin at the Marine Biological Laboratory (MBL) where Albert Szent-Györgyi had a laboratory. In Lewin's laboratory, she was able to run her own experiments. While still a technician, Gibbs applied to study in the lab of Kenneth Thimann at Harvard University as a PhD student. She started working toward a PhD  at Harvard in the fall of 1958 as a National Science Foundation Fellow, graduating with a PhD degree in November 1961.

While at Harvard, Gibbs switched advisors, completing her PhD under the advisement of George Chapman, studying  the pyrenoid structure in algae, as well as the ultrastructure of the chloroplast itself. In 1962, she published a paper titled "Nuclear envelope-chloroplast relationships in algae", detailing the unexpected discovery that in a number of algal classes the chloroplasts are surrounded by four, not two, membranes. Gibbs called the two extra membranes the outer envelope, but they were later named the chloroplast endoplasmic reticulum (ER) in a paper published by Ben Bouck in 1965.

She died in Newport, New Hampshire, at the age of 84.

References 

1930 births
2014 deaths
21st-century American biologists
Academic staff of McGill University
Cornell University College of Agriculture and Life Sciences alumni
Harvard Graduate School of Arts and Sciences alumni
Fellows of the Royal Society of Canada
Fellows of the American Association for the Advancement of Science